Alison Sutcliffe is a prolific British theatre director who, until 2011, was Artistic Director of The Bridge Project at the Bridge House Theatre, Warwick, during which time she created an ensemble theatre company which produced eleven productions. She has worked internationally, most notably with the Royal Shakespeare Company and on Broadway.

She married actor Ben Kingsley in 1978, and the two had sons Edmund (born 1982) and actor Ferdinand (born 1988) before divorcing in 1992.

External links
Alison Sutcliffe's website
B Kingsley on IMDB.com ref partnership and children
Notes from spock.com

Year of birth missing (living people)
Living people
English theatre directors
Place of birth missing (living people)